Saale-Wipper is a Verbandsgemeinde ("collective municipality") in the district Salzlandkreis, in Saxony-Anhalt, Germany. Before 1 January 2010, it was a Verwaltungsgemeinschaft. It is situated southwest of Bernburg. It is named after the rivers Saale and Wipper, which flow through its territory. The seat of the Verbandsgemeinde is in Güsten.

The Verbandsgemeinde Saale-Wipper consists of the following municipalities:

 Alsleben
 Giersleben 
 Güsten
 Ilberstedt 
 Plötzkau

References

Verbandsgemeinden in Saxony-Anhalt